The 2001–02 Asian Cup Winners' Cup was the final season of association football competition run by the Asian Football Confederation specifically for its members cup holders.

First round

West Asia

|}
1 Al Salmiya withdrew.

East Asia

|}

1 Negombo Youth SC withdrew.
2 Công am were drawn against the representatives of Pakistan, but the Pakistani FA did not send a team.

Second round

West Asia

|}

East Asia

|}

Quarterfinals

West Asia

|}

East Asia

|}

Semifinals

Third place match

Final

References
Asian Cup Winners Cup 2002

Asian Cup Winners' Cup
2001 in Asian football
2002 in Asian football